The dusky crimsonwing (Cryptospiza jacksoni) is a common species of estrildid finch found in Africa. It has an estimated global extent of occurrence of 78,000 km2.

It is found in the Albertine Rift montane forests.

The binomial name commemorates the English explorer Frederick John Jackson.

References

External links
BirdLife International species factsheet

dusky crimsonwing
Birds of Sub-Saharan Africa
dusky crimsonwing